Helwan University is a public university based in Helwan, Egypt, which is part of Greater Cairo on over . It comprises 23 faculties and two higher institutes in addition to 50 research centers.

Overview 
Helwan University is a member of the Egyptian Supreme Council of Universities. It was established on July 26, 1980 by Act No. 70 of 1975 over 350 acres of land. It is the youngest of 3 major governmental universities in Cairo.

However, it goes back to the 19th century during the reign of Muhammad Ali of Egypt who established “The Operations School”. The fields of that school were the basis of many institutes that formed Helwan University later.

Although Helwan University is the most recent of 3 major governmental universities in Cairo, it encompasses some of the oldest faculties not only in Egypt but also in the Middle East. The Faculty of Applied Arts, for example, was established in 1839, while the Faculty of Fine Arts and Art Education were established in 1908 and 1936 respectively.

Location 
The main campus of the university is in Helwan, Cairo .A number of faculties have been moved there, while others are still located in Zamalek, Boulaq, Giza, El Manyal and  Ain Shams.

Presidents of Helwan University 
 Abdel Razek Abdel Fattah Ibrahim (1975-1979)
 Mohamed Ismail Alam al-Din (1979-1986)
 Kamal Mohamed Ahmad al-Sarraj (1986-1989)
 Mohamed Kamal Ahmad Al-Attar (1989-1993)
 Mohamed Mahmoud El-Gohary (1993-1997)
 Hassan Mohamed Hussein Hosni (1997-2002)
 Amr Ezzat Salama (2002-2004)
 Abdelhay Obeid (2004-2007)
 Abdullah Barakat (2007-2009)
 Mahmoud Nasser Al-Tayeb (2009-2011)
 Mohamed Abdel Hamid El-Nashar (2011-2012)
 Yasser Hosni Mohamed Saqr (2012-2013)
 Majed Fahmy Najm (2017 - 2021)
 Mamdouh Mahmoud Mahdy (2021 - 2022)
 Elsayed Ibrahim Mohamed Kandil (2022–present)

Faculties of Helwan University 
 Faculty of Applied Arts (1839)
 Faculty of Fine Arts (1980)
 Faculty of Art Education (1932)  
 Faculty of Music Education (1935)
 Faculty of Home Economics (1937)
 Faculty of Art Education (1932)
 Faculty of Physical Education - Girls (1937) 
 Faculty of Physical Education - Boys (1937)
 Faculty of Social Work (1947)
 Faculty of Engineering Mataria (1955)
 Faculty of Engineering Helwan (1959)
 Faculty of Commerce and Business Administration (1961)
 Faculty of Tourism and Hotels (1962)
 Faculty of Science (1980)
 Faculty of Education (1982)
 Faculty of Technology Education (1989)
 Faculty of Arts (1995)
 Faculty of Computer and Intelligence (1995)
 Faculty of Law (1995)
 Faculty of Pharmacy (1995)
 Faculty of Nursing (2206)
 Faculty of Medicine (2013)
 Faculty of Postgraduate Interdisciplinary Studies (2014)
 Technical Institute of Nursing (2014)
 National Intellectual Property Institute (2016)

Central Library 
In addition to the Central Library, there are libraries for specialties in each faculty.

Ranking
According to Webometrics Ranking of World Universities, Helwan University is ranked 1987th in the world and tenth in Egypt.

In QS ranking 2020 Helwan University was rated 41st in The Arab Region and eighth in Egypt.

See also 
 College of Fine Arts in Cairo
 Education in Egypt
 List of universities in Egypt

References

External links 
 

 
Educational institutions established in 1975
Buildings and structures in Cairo Governorate
1975 establishments in Egypt
Universities in Egypt
Education in Cairo